On August 12, 2014 a magnitude 5.1 earthquake struck Ecuador  west-southwest of Cayambe at a depth of . The earthquake shook Ecuador's capital Quito , causing large dust clouds and prompting the temporary shutdown of Quito's Mariscal Sucre International Airport.  The earthquake killed at least 4 people including two men who were buried by a landslide in a local quarry.  It also injured at least 8 others. Earthquakes are commonplace in Ecuador because of its position along the "Ring of Fire," an area of high seismic activity that encircles the Pacific Ocean.

See also
 List of earthquakes in 2014
 List of earthquakes in Ecuador
 Ring of Fire

References

External links

2014 earthquakes
2014 in Ecuador
Earthquakes in Ecuador